Henry Dinwoodey Marsh (born March 15, 1954 in Boston, Massachusetts) is a retired runner from the United States, who made four U.S. Olympic teams and represented his native country in the men's 3,000 meter Steeplechase in three Summer Olympics, from 1976 through 1988.

Biography
Marsh qualified for the 1980 US Olympic team but was unable to compete due to the 1980 Summer Olympics boycott. He did however receive one of 461 Congressional Gold Medals created especially for the spurned athletes. Track & Field News ranked him the number one steeplechaser in the world for 1981, 1982, and 1985. Moreover, he was world ranked (i.e., top 10) in this event for 12 consecutive years, 1977-1988. Marsh broke the American Record for the steeplechase on four occasions: 8:21.55 (July 5, 1977), 8:15.68 (June 28, 1980), 8:12.37 (August 17, 1983), and 8:09.17 (August 28, 1985); the last mark lasted almost 21 years until Daniel Lincoln ran 8:08.82 in Rome on July 14, 2006.

During the 1984 Olympic Games, Marsh entered the event with a #2 world ranking. On race day for the 3,000 meter steeplechase finals, Marsh finished fourth (losing out on the bronze medal to teammate Brian Diemer by only 0.19 seconds), then collapsed to the track and was carried out of the Los Angeles Memorial Coliseum on a gurney. In 1985 Marsh joined the sub-4 minute group of milers with a 3:59.31 run at Bern, Switzerland on August 16.

Marsh was the American champion in the steeplechase nine times (1978, 1979, 1981–1987) and in 1983 received the Glenn Cunningham Award as the best distance runner in America.

Personal life
Marsh was a co-founder of MonaVie, a multi-level marketing (MLM) company that folded in 2015. He served as executive vice-president and later as the company's Vice Chairman of the Board.  According to Forbes, MonaVie's business plan resembled a pyramid scheme. He is also a member of the Church of Jesus Christ of Latter-day Saints.  He spent two years on mission in Brazil. In 2008, the Sacramento Bee noted that Marsh was a major financial supporter (two donations totalling $90,000) of Proposition 8, a California ballot initiative to eliminate same-sex marriage rights.

Achievements
All results regarding 3000 metres steeplechase.
9-time US Champion 1978-1979, 1981-1987 (2nd in 1980)
2-time US Olympic Trials winner 1980 & 1984 (2nd  in 1976 & 1988)

References

External links
 1983 Year Ranking
 
 
 
 
 

1954 births
Latter Day Saints from Massachusetts
20th-century Mormon missionaries
Living people
Brigham Young University alumni
American male long-distance runners
American male steeplechase runners
Athletes (track and field) at the 1976 Summer Olympics
Athletes (track and field) at the 1984 Summer Olympics
Athletes (track and field) at the 1988 Summer Olympics
Athletes (track and field) at the 1979 Pan American Games
Athletes (track and field) at the 1987 Pan American Games
Olympic track and field athletes of the United States
People associated with direct selling
Pan American Games medalists in athletics (track and field)
Pan American Games gold medalists for the United States
Congressional Gold Medal recipients
Track and field athletes from Boston
Goodwill Games medalists in athletics
Competitors at the 1986 Goodwill Games
Medalists at the 1979 Pan American Games
Medalists at the 1987 Pan American Games